Africana is a breed of domesticated sheep (also known as Pelona, Camuro or Camura, Red African, Rojo Africana, Colombian Wooless, West African) found in  Colombia and Venezuela.  This breed is polled and is about the same size as the Pelibüey.  The Africana is raised for their meat and is classified as a hair breed.

Characteristics
The Africana is often some shade of tan to brown.

Notes

References

Sheep breeds
Sheep breeds originating in Colombia
Sheep breeds originating in Venezuela